Ibrahima Sory Conté (born June 3, 1981) is a Guinean football player.

He was part of the Guinean 2004 African Nations Cup team, who finished second in their group in the first round of competition, before losing in the quarter finals to Mali. He was released in August 2008 by Tours FC.

References

External links
 weltfussball

1981 births
Living people
Guinean footballers
Guinean expatriate footballers
2004 African Cup of Nations players
K.S.C. Lokeren Oost-Vlaanderen players
Tours FC players
Hafia FC players
Belgian Pro League players
Expatriate footballers in Belgium
Expatriate footballers in France
Association football defenders